is a private university in Nagaoka, Niigata, Japan. The predecessor of the school was founded in 1905. In 1971, the institution was reorganized as the Nagaoka Women's Junior College and in 1973 was chartered as a coeducational junior college. One of the first teachers of the Women's College was Kanai Yoshiko. In 2001 it became a four-year college.

References

External links
 Official website 

Educational institutions established in 1973
Private universities and colleges in Japan
Universities and colleges in Niigata Prefecture
1973 establishments in Japan
Buildings and structures in Nagaoka, Niigata